Agkistrodon piscivorus is a species of pit viper in the subfamily Crotalinae of the family Viperidae. It is one of the world's few semiaquatic vipers (along with the Florida cottonmouth), and is native to the southeastern United States. As an adult, it is large and capable of delivering a painful and potentially fatal bite. When threatened, it may respond by coiling its body and displaying its fangs. Individuals may bite when feeling threatened or being handled in any way. It tends to be found in or near water, particularly in slow-moving and shallow lakes, streams, and marshes. It is a capable swimmer and, like several species of snakes, is known to occasionally enter bays and estuaries and swim between barrier islands and the mainland.

The generic name is derived from the Greek words   "fish-hook, hook" and   "tooth", and the specific name comes from the Latin  "fish" and  "(I) eat greedily, devour"; thus, the scientific name translates to "hook-toothed fish-eater". Common names include cottonmouth, Northern cottonmouth, water moccasin, swamp moccasin, black moccasin, and simply viper. Many of the common names refer to the threat display, in which this species will often stand its ground and gape at an intruder, exposing the white lining of its mouth. Many scientists dislike the use of the term water moccasin since it can lead to confusion between the venomous cottonmouth and non-venomous water snakes.

Description
Agkistrodon piscivorus is the largest species of the genus Agkistrodon. Adults commonly exceed  in total length (including tail); females are typically smaller than males. Occasionally, individuals may exceed  in total length, especially in the eastern part of the range.

This snake had apparently been injured during capture, died several days later, and was measured when straight and relaxed.

The broad head is distinct from the neck, and the snout is blunt in profile with the rim of the top of the head extending forwards slightly further than the mouth. Substantial cranial plates are present, although the parietal plates are often fragmented, especially towards the rear. A loreal scale is absent. Six to 9 supralabials and eight to 12 infralabials are seen. At midbody, there are 23–27 rows of dorsal scales. All dorsal scale rows have keels, although those on the lowermost scale rows are weak. In males/females, the ventral scales number 130-145/128-144 and the subcaudals 38-54/36-50. Many of the latter may be divided.

Though the majority of specimens are almost or even totally black, (with the exception of the head and facial markings), the color pattern may consist of a brown, gray, tan, yellowish-olive, or blackish ground color, which is overlaid with a series of 10–17 dark brown to almost black crossbands. These crossbands, which usually have black edges, are sometimes broken along the dorsal midline to form a series of staggered halfbands on either side of the body. These crossbands are visibly lighter in the center, almost matching the ground color, often contain irregular dark markings, and extend well down onto the ventral scales. The dorsal banding pattern fades with age, so older individuals are an almost uniform olive-brown, grayish-brown, or black. The belly is white, yellowish-white, or tan, marked with dark spots, and becomes darker posteriorly. The amount of dark pigment on the belly varies from virtually none to almost completely black. The head is a more or less uniform brown color, especially in A. p. piscivorus. Subadult specimens may exhibit the same kind of dark, parietal spots characteristic of A. contortrix, but sometimes these are still visible in adults. Eastern populations have a broad, dark, postocular stripe, bordered with pale pigment above and below, that is faint or absent in western populations. The underside of the head is generally whitish, cream, or tan.

Juvenile and subadult specimens generally have a more contrasting color pattern, with dark crossbands on a lighter ground color. The ground color is then tan, brown, or reddish brown. The tip of the tail is usually yellowish, becoming greenish yellow or greenish in subadults, and then black in adults. On some juveniles, the banding pattern can also be seen on the tail.  Young snakes wiggle the tips of their tails to lure prey animals.

This species is often confused with the copperhead, A. contortrix. This is especially true for juveniles, but differences exist. A. piscivorus has broad, dark stripes on the sides of its head that extend back from the eye, whereas A. contortrix has only a thin, dark line that divides the pale supralabials from the somewhat darker color of the head. The watersnakes of the genus Nerodia are also similar in appearance, being thick-bodied with large heads, but they have round pupils, no loreal pit, a single anal plate, subcaudal scales that are divided throughout, and a distinctive overall color pattern.

Common names
This is a list of common names for Agkistrodon piscivorus, some of which also refer to other species:

aquatic moccasin
black moccasin
black snake
black water viper
blunt-tail moccasin
Congo
copperhead
cottonmouth
cotton-mouthed snake
cottonmouth rattler
cottonmouth water moccasin
gaper
gapper
highland moccasin
lake moccasin
lowland moccasin
mangrove rattler
moccasin
moccasin snake
North American cottonmouth snake
North American water moccasin
North American water viper
pond moccasin
pond rattler
river moccasin
river rattler
rusty moccasin
saltwater rattler
short-tailed moccasin
short-tail rattler
small-tailed cottonmouth
snap-jaw
stub-tail
stub-tail snake
stump moccasin
stump-tail moccasin
stump-tail viper
swamp lion
swamp moccasin
swamp rattler
Texas moccasin
trap jaw
Troost's moccasin
true horn snake
true water moccasin
viper
water copperhead
water mamba
water moccasin
water mokeson
water pilot
water pit rattler
water pit viper
water rattlesnake
water viper 
white-mouth moccasin
white-mouth rattler 
worm-tailed viper

Geographic range

A. piscivorus is found in the eastern US from the Great Dismal Swamp in southeast Virginia, south through the Florida peninsula and west to Arkansas, eastern and southern Oklahoma, and western and southern Georgia (excluding Lake Lanier and Lake Allatoona). A few records exist of the species being found along the Rio Grande in Texas, but these are thought to represent disjunct populations, now possibly eradicated. The type locality given is "Carolina", although Schmidt (1953) proposed this be restricted to the area around Charleston, South Carolina.

Campbell and Lamar (2004) mentioned this species as being found in Alabama, Arkansas, Florida, Georgia, Illinois, Indiana, Kentucky, Louisiana, Mississippi, Missouri,  North Carolina, Oklahoma, South Carolina, Tennessee, Texas, and Virginia. Maps provided by Campbell and Lamar (2004) and Wright and Wright (1957) also indicate its presence in Western and Middle Tennessee and extreme southeastern Kansas, and limit it to the western part of Kentucky.

In Georgia, it is found in the southern half of the state up to a few kilometers north of the Fall Line with few exceptions. Its range also includes the Ohio River Valley as far north as southern Indiana, and it inhabits many barrier islands off the coasts of the states where it is found.

Conservation status
The species A. piscivorus is classified as least concern on the IUCN Red List (v3.1, 2007). Species are listed as such due to their wide distribution, presumed large population, or because they are unlikely to be declining fast enough to qualify for listing in a more threatened category. When last assessed in 2007, the population trend was stable.

Constant persecution of the species and drainage of wetland habitat prior to development has taken a heavy toll on local populations. Despite this, it remains a common species in many areas.

In Indiana, the cottonmouth is listed as an endangered species.

Habitat
 
Agkistrodon piscivorus is the most aquatic species of the genus Agkistrodon, and is usually associated with bodies of water, such as creeks, streams, marshes, swamps, and the shores of ponds and lakes. The U.S. Navy (1991) describes it as inhabiting swamps, shallow lakes, and sluggish streams, but it is usually not found in swift, deep, cool water. Behler and King (1979) list its habitats as including lowland swamps, lakes, rivers, bayheads, sloughs, irrigation ditches, canals, rice fields, and small, clear, rocky, mountain streams.

It is also found in brackish-water habitats and is sometimes seen swimming in salt water. It has been much more successful at colonizing Atlantic and Gulf coast barrier islands than the copperhead. However, even on these islands, it tends to favor freshwater marshes. A study by Dunson and Freda (1985) describes it as not being particularly salt-tolerant.

The snake is not limited to aquatic habitats, however, as Gloyd and Conant (1990) mentioned large specimens have been found more than a mile (1.6 km) from water. In various locations, the species is well-adapted to less moist environments, such as palmetto thickets, pine-palmetto forest, pine woods in East Texas, pine flatwoods in Florida, eastern deciduous dune forest, dune and beach areas, riparian forest, and prairies.

Behavior

In tests designed to measure the various behavioral responses by wild specimens to encounters with people, 23 of 45 (51%) tried to escape, while 28 of 36 (78%) resorted to threat displays and other defensive tactics. Only when they were picked up with a mechanical hand were they likely to bite.

When sufficiently stressed or threatened, this species engages in a characteristic threat display that includes vibrating its tail and throwing its head back with its mouth open to display the startlingly white interior, often making a loud hiss while the neck and front part of the body are pulled into an S-shaped position.<ref name="C&G-G&C90">Carpenter CC, Gillingham JC (1990). "Ritualized Behavior in Agkistrodon and Allied Genera". pp. 523–531. In: Gloyd HK, Conant R (1990). Snakes of the Agkistrodon Complex: A Monographic Review. Society for the Study of Amphibians and Reptiles. 614 pp. 52 plates. LCCN 89-50342. .</ref> Many of its common names, including "cottonmouth" and "gaper", refer to this behavior, while its habit of snapping its jaws shut when anything touches its mouth has earned it the name "trap jaw" in some areas. Other defensive responses can include flattening the body and emitting a strong, pungent secretion from the anal glands located at the base of the tail. This musk may be ejected in thin jets if the snake is sufficiently agitated or restrained. The smell has been likened to that of a billy goat, as well as to a genus of common flood-plain weeds, Pluchea, that also have a penetrating odor.

Harmless watersnakes of the genus Nerodia are often mistaken for it. These are also semiaquatic, thick-bodied snakes with large heads that can be aggressive when provoked, but they behave differently. For example, watersnakes usually flee quickly into the water, while A. piscivorus often stands its ground with its threat display. In addition, watersnakes do not vibrate their tails when excited. A. piscivorus usually holds its head at an angle around 45° when swimming or crawling.

Brown (1973) considered their heavy muscular bodies to be a striking characteristic, stating this made it difficult to hold them for venom extraction owing to their strength.

This species may be active during the day and at night. However, on bright, sunny days, they are usually found coiled or stretched out somewhere in the shade. In the morning and on cool days, they can often be seen basking in the sunlight. They often emerge at sunset to warm themselves on warm ground (i.e., sidewalks, roads) and then become very active throughout the night, when they are usually found swimming or crawling. Contrary to popular belief, they are capable of biting while under water.

In the north, they hibernate during the winter. Niell (1947, 1948) made observations in Georgia, and noted they were one of the last species to seek shelter, often being found active until the first heavy frosts. At this point, they moved to higher ground and could be found in rotting pine stumps by tearing away the bark. These snakes could be quite active upon discovery and would then attempt to burrow more deeply into the soft wood or escape to the nearest water. In southeastern Virginia, Wood (1954) reported seeing migratory behavior in late October and early November. During a period of three or four days, as many as 50 individuals could be seen swimming across Back Bay from the bayside swamps of the barrier islands to the mainland. He suggested this might have something to do with hibernating habits. In the southern parts of its range, hibernation may be short or omitted altogether.

Feeding

Raymond Ditmars (1912) described A. piscivorus as carnivorous. Its diet includes mammals, birds, amphibians, fish, eggs, insects, other snakes, small turtles, and small alligators. Cannibalism has also been reported. Normally, though, the bulk of its diet consists of fish and frogs. On occasion, juvenile specimens feed on invertebrates. Catfish (especially of the genus Ictalurus) are often eaten, although the sharp spines sometimes cause injuries. Toads of the genus Bufo are apparently avoided. Common prey species include southern leopard frogs, bass, juvenile black rat snakes, young common snapping turtles, and North American least shrews.

Many authors have described the prey items taken under natural circumstances. Although fish and frogs are their most common prey, they eat almost any small vertebrate. Fish are captured by cornering them in shallow water, usually against the bank or under logs. They take advantage when bodies of water begin to dry up in the summer or early fall and gorge themselves on the resulting high concentrations of fish and tadpoles. They are surprisingly unsuccessful at seizing either live or dead fish under water.

They are opportunistic feeders and sometimes eat carrion, making them one of the few snakes to do so. Campbell and Lamar (2004) described having seen them feeding on fish heads and viscera that had been thrown into the water from a dock. Heinrich and Studenroth (1996) reported an occasion in which an individual was seen feeding on the butchered remains of a feral hog (Sus scrofa) that had been thrown into Cypress Creek. Northern Cottonmouths have an unusual feeding adaptation that allows them to adhere to prey through rotation of their head during swallowing because it aids the jaws in clearing the prey and contributes to the advance of the jaws along the prey. 

Conant (1929) gave a detailed account of the feeding behavior of a captive specimen from South Carolina. When prey was introduced, the snake quickly became attentive and made an attack. Frogs and small birds were seized and held until movement stopped. Larger prey was approached in a more cautious manner; a rapid strike was executed after which the snake would withdraw. In 2.5 years, the snake had accepted three species of frogs, including a large bullfrog, a spotted salamander, water snakes, garter snakes, sparrows, young rats, and three species of mice. Brimley (1944) described a captive specimen that ate copperheads (A. contortrix), as well as members of its own species, keeping its fangs embedded in its victims until they had been immobilized. Another study done in 2018 found that northern cottonmouths on a diet of only fish when compared to a diet of mice had to eat 20% more to achieve the same growth.

Young individuals have yellowish or greenish tail tips and engage in caudal luring. The tail tip is wriggled to lure prey, such as frogs and lizards, within striking distance. Wharton (1960) observed captive specimens exhibiting this behavior between 07:20 and 19:40 hours, which suggests it is a daytime activity.

In August 2022, an individual found in Florida was observed to have consumed an introduced Burmese python (Python bivittatus). Burmese pythons are an invasive species in Florida with the capacity to inflict great damage to the local ecosystem, so it is hoped that A. piscivorus may be in the process of modifying its diet to enable it to hunt the pythons.

Predators
Agkistrodon piscivorus is preyed upon by snapping turtles (Chelydra serpentina), falcons, American alligators (Alligator mississippiensis), horned owls (Bubo virginianus), eagles, red-shouldered hawks (Buteo lineatus), loggerhead shrikes (Lanius ludovicianus), and large wading birds, such as herons, cranes, and egrets.

It is also preyed upon by ophiophagous snakes, including their own species. Humphreys (1881) described how a  specimen was killed and eaten by a  captive kingsnake. On the other hand, Neill (1947) reported captive kingsnakes (Lampropeltis getula) were loath to attack them, being successfully repelled with "body blows". Also called body-bridging, this is a specific defensive behavior against ophiophagous snakes, first observed in certain rattlesnake (Crotalus) species by Klauber (1927), that involves raising a section of the middle of the body above the ground to varying heights. This raised loop may then be held in this position for varying amounts of time, shifted in position, or moved towards the attacker. In the latter case, it is often flipped or thrown vigorously in the direction of the assailant. In A. piscivorus, the loop is raised laterally, with the belly facing towards the attacker.

Reproduction

Agkistrodon piscivorus is ovoviviparous, with females usually giving birth to one to 16 live young and possibly as many as 20. Litters of six to eight are the most common. Neonates are 22–35 cm in length (excluding runts), with the largest belonging to A. p. conanti and A. p. leucostoma the smallest. If weather conditions are favorable and food is readily available, growth is rapid and females may reproduce at less than three years of age and a total length of as little as 60 cm. The young are born in August or September, while mating may occur during any of the warmer months of the year, at least in certain parts of its range.

Regarding A. p. piscivorus, an early account by Stejneger (1895) described a pair in the Berlin Zoological Garden that mated on January 21, 1873, after which eight neonates were discovered in the cage on July 16 of that year. The young were each 26 cm in length and 1.5 cm thick. They shed for the first time within two weeks, after which they accepted small frogs, but not fish.

Combat behavior between males has been reported on a number of occasions, and is very similar in form to that seen in many other viperid species. An important factor in sexual selection, it allows for the establishment and recognition of dominance as males compete for access to sexually active females.

A few accounts exist that describe females defending their newborn litters. Wharten (1960, 1966) reported several cases where females found near their young stood their ground and considered these to be examples of guarding behavior. Another case was described by Walters and Card (1996) in which a female was found at the entrance of a chamber with seven neonates crawling on or around her. When one of the young was moved a short distance from the chamber, she seemed to be agitated and faced the intruder. Eventually, all of her offspring retreated into the chamber, but the female remained at the entrance, ready to strike.

Facultative parthenogenesis
Parthenogenesis is a natural form of reproduction in which growth and development of embryos occur without fertilization. A. piscivorus can reproduce by facultative parthenogenesis, that is, they are capable of switching from a sexual mode of reproduction to an asexual mode.  This likely involves recombination at the tips of the chromosomes, which leads to genome wide homozygosity. The result is the expression of deleterious recessive alleles and often to developmental failure (inbreeding depression).  Both captive-born and wild-born A. piscivorus specimens appear to be capable of this form of parthenogenesis.

Venom
Agkistrodon piscivorus venom is more toxic than that of A. contortrix, and is rich with powerful cytotoxic venom that destroys tissue. Although deaths are rare, the bite can leave scars, and on occasion, require amputation. Absent an anaphylactic reaction in a bitten individual, however, the venom does not cause systemic reactions in victims and does not contain neurotoxic components present in numerous rattlesnake species. Bites can be effectively treated with CroFab antivenom; this serum is derived using venom components from four species of American pit vipers (the eastern and western diamondback rattlesnakes, the Mojave rattlesnake, and the cottonmouth).

Bites from the cottonmouth are relatively frequent in the lower Mississippi River Valley and along the coast of the Gulf of Mexico, although fatalities are rare. Allen and Swindell (1948) compiled a record of A. piscivorus bites in Florida from newspaper accounts and data from the Bureau of Vital Statistics: 1934, eight bites and three fatalities (no further fatalities were recorded after this year); 1935, 10; 1936, 16; 1937, 7; 1938, 6; 1939, 5; 1940, 3; 1941, 6; 1942, 3; 1943, 1; 1944, 3; 1998, 1. Wright and Wright (1957) report having encountered these snakes on countless occasions, often almost stepping on them, but never being bitten. In addition, they heard of no reports of any bites among 400 cypress cutters in the Okefenokee Swamp during the entire summer of 1921. These accounts suggest that the species is not particularly aggressive.

Brown (1973) gave an average venom yield (dried) of 125 mg, with a range of 80–237 mg, along with  values of 4.0, 2.2, 2.7, 3.5, 2.0 mg/kg IV, 4.8, 5.1, 4.0, 5.5, 3.8, 6.8 mg/kg IP and 25.8 mg/kg SC for toxicity. Wolff and Githens (1939) described a  specimen that yielded 3.5 ml of venom during the first extraction and 4.0 ml five weeks later (1.094 grams of dried venom). The human lethal dose is unknown, but has been estimated at 100–150 mg.

Symptoms commonly include ecchymosis and swelling. The pain is generally more severe than bites from the copperhead, but less so than those from rattlesnakes (Crotalus spp.). The formation of vesicles and bullae is less common than with rattlesnake bites, although necrosis can occur. Myokymia is sometimes reported.<ref name="Nor-C&L04">Norris R (2004). "Venom Poisoning in North American Reptiles". In: Campbell JA, Lamar WW (2004). The Venomous Reptiles of the Western Hemisphere. Ithaca and London: Comstock Publishing Associates. 870 pp. 1,500 plates. .</ref> However, the venom has strong proteolytic activity that can lead to severe tissue destruction.

Subspecies and taxonomic changes
For many decades, one species with three subspecies were formally recognized: eastern cottonmouth, A. p. piscivorus (Lacépède, 1789); western cottonmouth, A. p. leucostoma (Troost, 1836); and Florida cottonmouth, A. p. conanti Gloyd, 1969. However, a molecular (DNA) based study was published in 2014, applying phylogenetic theories (one implication being no subspecies are recognized), changing the long-standing taxonomy. The resulting and current taxonomic arrangement recognizes two species and no subspecies. The western cottonmouth (A. p. leucostoma) was synonymized with the eastern cottonmouth (A. p. piscivorus) into one species (with the oldest published name, A. p. piscivorus, having priority). The Florida cottonmouth (A. p. conanti) is now recognized as a separate species.

 Agkistrodon piscivorus (Lacépéde, 1789), northern cottonmouth
 Agkistrodon conanti Gloyd, 1969, Florida cottonmouth (south Georgia and Florida peninsular)

References

Further reading

Allen ER, Swindell D (1948). "The cottonmouth moccasin of Florida". Herpetologica 4 (supplement 1): 1–16.
Baird SF, Girard C (1853). Catalogue of North American Reptiles in the Museum of the Smithsonian Institution. Part I.—Serpentes. Washington, District of Columbia: Smithsonian Institution. xvi + 172 pp. (for a discussion of the publication date, see Adler K. 1963. J. Ohio Herpetol. Soc. 4: 55–57).
Bonnaterre P-J (1790). Ophiologie. pp. 1–76. In Tableau encyclopédique et méthodique des trois règnes de la nature [Encyclopédie Methodique]. Paris, France: Chez Panckoucke, Libraire. i–xliv + 1–76. (in French).
Boulenger GA (1896). Catalogue of the Snakes in the British Museum (Natural History). Volume III., Containing the Colubridæ (Opisthoglyphæ and Proteroglyphæ), Amblycephalidæ, and Viperidæ. London: Trustees of the British Museum (Natural History). (Taylor and Francis, printers). xiv + 727 pp. (Ancistrodon piscivorus, pp. 520–521).
Brimley CS (1944). Amphibians and Reptiles of North Carolina. Elon College, North Carolina, Carolina Biol. Supply Co., reprinted from Carolina Tips, 1939–43: 1–63.
Catesby M (1743). The natural history of Carolina, Florida and the Bahama Islands: Containing the figures of birds, beasts, fishes, serpents, insects, and plants: Particularly the forest-trees, shrubs, and other plants, not hitherto described, or very incorrectly figured by authors. Together with their descriptions in English and French. To which are added, observation on the air, soil, and waters; With remarks upon agriculture, grain, pulse, roots, &c, To the whole is prefixed a new and correct map of the countries treated of. London, Printed at the expense of the author, 1731–1743: 2 vols. Vol.II: 100 + 200 (appendix).
Conant R (1929). "Notes on a water moccasin in captivity (Agkistrodon piscivorus) (female)". Bull. Antivenin Inst. Amer. 3: 61–64.
Cope ED (1860) (dated 1859). "Catalogue of the venomous serpents in the museum of the Academy of Natural Sciences of Philadelphia, with notes on the families, genera and species". Proc. Acad. Nat. Sci. Philadelphia 11: 332–347.
Cope ED (1875). Check-list of North American Batrachia and Reptiles with a systematic list of higher groups, and an essay on geographical distribution based on specimens contained in the United States National Museum. Washington, District of Columbia: Government Printing Office. 104 pp.
Cuvier G (1829). Le règne animal distribué d'après son organisation, pour servir de base à l'histoire naturelle des animaux det d'introduction à l'anatomie comparée. Tome II, contenant les reptiles, les poissons, les mollusques et les annélidés. Nouvelle édition. Paris: Déterville. xv + 406 pp. (in French).
Daudin FM (1801–1803). Histoire naturelle, générale et particulière des reptiles: ouvrage faisant suit à l'histoire naturelle générale et particulière, composée par Leclerc de Buffon; et rédigée par C.S. Sonnini, miembre de plusieurs sociétés savantes. 8 vols. Paris: F. Dufart.  (in French). (for a discussion of the publication date, see F. Harper. 1940. Amer. Midl. Nat. 23: 693).
Ditmars RL (1912). "The feeding habits of serpents". Zoologica 1: 197–238.
Duméril A-M-C, Bibron G, Duméril A-H-A (1854). Erpetologie générale ou histoire naturelle complète des reptiles. Vol. 7. (Parts 1 and 2). Paris: Librarie Encyclopédique de Roret. 1,536 pp. (in French).
Dunson WA, Freda J (1985). "Water permeability of the skin of the amphibious snake, Agkistrodon piscivorus ". J. Herpetol. 19 (1): 93–98.
Garman S (1884) (dated 1883). "The reptiles and batrachians of North America". Memoires of the Museum of Comparative Zoology 8 (3): 1–185.
Garman S (1890). "Notes on Illinois reptiles and amphibians, including several specimens not before recorded from the northern states". Bulletin of the Illinois Natural History Survey 3: 185–190.
Gloyd HK, Conant R (1943). "A synopsis of the American forms of Agkistrodon (copperheads and moccasins)". Bull. Chicago Acad. Sci. 7: 147–170.
Goin CJ, Goin OB, Zug GR (1978). Introduction to Herpetology, Third Edition. San Francisco: W.H. Freeman and Company. xi + 378 pp. . (Agkistrodon piscivorus, pp. 113, 124, 336).
Gray JE (1842). "Synopsis of the species of rattle-snakes, or family of Crotalidae". Zoological Miscellany, London 2: 47–51 (reprinted in 1971 by the Society for the Study of Amphibians and Reptiles).
Harlan R (1835). Medical and physical research of original memories in medicine, surgery, physiology, geology, zoology and comparative anatomy. Philadelphia. xxxix + 635 pp.
Heinrich G, Studenroth KR Jr (1996). "Natural history notes: Agkistrodon piscivorus conanti (Florida cottonmouth). Diet". Herpetol. Rev. 27 (1): 22.
Higgins SB (1873). Ophidians, zoological arrangement of the different genera, including varieties known in North and South America, the East Indies, South Africa, and Australia. The poisons, and all that is known of their nature. The galls as antidotes to the snake venom. Pathological, toxicological, and microscopical facts; together with much interesting matter hitherto not published. New York: Boericke & Tafel. 239 pp.
Holbrook JE (1838). North American Herpetology; Or, a Description of the Reptiles Inhabiting the United States. Volume 2. Philadelphia, Pennsylvania: J. Dobson: i–iv + 5–125.
Hubbs B, O'Connor B (2012). A Guide to the Rattlesnakes and other Venomous Serpents of the United States. Tempe, Arizona: Tricolor Books. 129 pp. . (Agkistrodon piscivorus, pp. 104–109, 125–126).
Humphreys JT (1881). "The king snake (Ophibolus sayi) sups on a full grown water moccasin (Ancistrodon piscivorus)". Amer. Nat. 15: 561–562.
Jan G (1863). Elenco sistematico degli ofidi descritti e disegnati per l'iconografia generale. Milan, Italy: A. Lombardi. vii + 143 pp. (in Italian).
Klauber LM (1927). "Some observations on the rattlesnakes of the extreme southwest". Bull. Antivenin Inst. Amer. 1 (1): 7–21.
Lacépède BGE (1789). Histoire naturelle des quadrupèdes ovipares et des serpentes, vol. 2 Table Méthodique. Paris, France: Hotel de Thou. 527 pp. (in French).
Merrem B (1820). Versuch eines Systems der Amphibien. Tentamen systematis amphibiorum. Marburg: J.C. Krieger. xv + 191 pp. + 1 plate. (in German and Latin).
Morris PA (1948). Boy's Book of Snakes: How to Recognize and Understand Them. (A volume of the Humanizing Science Series, edited by Jaques Cattell). New York: Ronald Press. viii + 185 pp. (Agkistrodon piscivorus, pp. 114–117, 180).
Niell WT Jr (1947). "Size and habits of the cottonmouth moccasin". Herpetologica 3: 203–205.
Niell WT Jr (1948). "Hibernation of amphibians and reptiles in Richmond County, Georgia". Herpetologica 4: 107–114.
Powell R, Conant R, Collins JT (2016). Peterson Field Guide to Reptiles and Amphibians of Eastern and Central North America, Fourth Edition. Boston and New York: Houghton Mifflin Harcourt. xiv + 494 pp. 47 Plates, 207 Figures. . (Agkistrodon piscivorus, pp. 437–438, Figure 198 + Plate 45).
Schmidt KP (1953). A check list of North American amphibians and reptiles. Sixth edition. Chicago, Illinois: American Society of Ichthyologists and Herpetologists. i–viii + 280 pp.
Schmidt KP, Davis DD (1941). Field Book of Snakes of the United States and Canada. New York: G.P. Putnam's Sons. 365 pp. 103 Figures. 34 plates. (Agkistrodon piscivorus, pp. 285–287, Figure 94 + Plate 30, Below).
Shaw G (1802). General Zoology or Systematic Natural History. Vol. 3. Part 2. Amphibia. London: Thomas Davidson. vi + 313–615.
Smith HM, Brodie ED Jr (1982). Reptiles of North America: A Guide to Field Identification. New York: Golden Press. 240 pp.  (paperback),  (hardcover). (Agkistrodon piscivorus, pp. 200–201).
Sonnini CS, Latreille PA (1801). Histoire naturelle des reptiles, avec figures dissinées dápres nature. 4 Vols. Paris. (in French). (for a discussion of the publication date, see Harper, F. 1940. Amer. Midl. Nat. 23: 692–723).
Stejneger L (1895). "The poisonous snakes of North America". Ann. Rept. U.S. Natl. Mus. 1893: 337–487.
Stejneger L, Barbour T (1917). A Check List of North American Amphibians and Reptiles. Cambridge, Massachusetts: Harvard University Press. 125 pp. (Agkistrodon piscivorus, p. 107).
Stewart GD (1974). "Diagnosis of two new American snakes". Baltimore Univ. Comm. (529 N. Howard St. / "an unincorp. free lance organization") 2: 1 [1].
Walters AC, Card W (1996). "Natural history notes: Agkistrodon piscivorus conanti (Florida cottonmouth). Prey". Herpetol. Rev. 27 (4): 203.
Wharton CH (1960). "Birth and behavior of a brood of cottonmouths, Agkistrodon piscivorus piscivorus, with notes on tail-luring". Herpetologica 16 (2): 125–129.
Wharton CH (1966). "Reproduction and growth in the cottonmouth, Agkistrodon piscivorus Lacépède, of Cedar Keys, Florida". Copeia 1966 (2): 149–161.
Wolff NO, Githens TS (1939). "Record venom extraction from water moccasin". Copeia 1939 (1): 52.
Wood JT (1954). "The distribution of poisonous snakes in Virginia". Virginia Journal of Science 5: 152–167.
Yarrow HC (1882). "Check list of North American Reptilia and Batrachia, with catalogue of specimens in the United States Museum". Bulletin of the U.S. National Museum 24: 1–249.
Zim HS, Smith HM (1956). Reptiles and Amphibians: A Guide to Familiar American Species: A Golden Nature Guide. Revised Edition. New York: Simon and Schuster. 160 pp. (Agkistrodon piscivorus'', pp. 109, 156).

External links

 
 
 Cottonmouth Fact Sheet  at Smithsonian National Zoological Park. Accessed 7 December 2007.
 Cottonmouth snake – bites, identification, diet and habitat. 
 Water Moccasin Snake * information on identification, range and natural history. 
 . Accessed 3 July 2008.

piscivorus
Reptiles of the United States
Fauna of the Southeastern United States
Venomous snakes
Taxa named by Bernard Germain de Lacépède
Reptiles described in 1789
Semiaquatic animals